Ivan Petrovych Chaus (born 12 December 1951) is a businessman and football chairman. In 1992 he became the president of Polissya Dobryanka football club. From 1999 to 2007 he was the president of Desna Chernihiv.

Biography
He was born on 14 April 1967 in Chernihiv, then part of Soviet Union. He became a businessman in the Chernihiv Oblast. He graduated from the Taras Shevchenko National University in Chernihiv. He was one of the creators of historical and cultural center of Sofia Rusova and president of the Sofia Rusova Charitable Foundation. In 2020 he became deputy of the Chernihiv Regional Council from the Servant of the People.

Football
In 1992 he become the president of Polissya Dobryanka. From 1999 to 2007 he was the president of Desna Chernihiv, succeeding Volodymyr Khomenko. In 2006 he made the transfer of Andriy Yarmolenko from Yunist Chernihiv Youth. In 2013 Chaus said that Yarmolenko wanted to play for Dynamo, despite the offer from Shakhtar. In 2018 the Chernihiv sports school Yunost should receive 240-250 thousand euros from the London West Ham United within a year for Andriy Yarmolenko as part of a solidarity payment, according to FootBoom. “I don’t remember the exact amount, it is just over 240 thousand euros. Maybe 241 thousand, maybe 242. But definitely more than 240 thousand and less than 250 thousand euros," said the former president of Desna Chernihiv, Ivan Chaus, who is now the head of the board of trustees of the Chernihiv club. Recall that last summer, the 28-year-old midfielder of the Ukraine national team moved to West Ham from Borussia Dortmund for 22 million pounds. This season, Yarmolenko took part in all the matches of the Hammers. He was invited to help the president of the club Valeriy Korotkov, and in 2009 was appointed as Vice-President in the presidency of Oleksandr Povorozniuk, but after his arrival he left the club. There were a lot of talk, rumors and gossip about this fact. Many fans still can't understand why one of Ukraine's most successful football managers left Desna. Ivan , in an interview, first reveal the secret of your resignation as vice-president of Desna Chernihiv . "When I came to Desna Chernihiv for the second time in February this year, my main goal was to make Chernihiv football "cleaner", to free it from the dirt that has accumulated recently. By dirt, I mean both bribing judges and turning a team into a "swap card" in political games. My wish was sincere, because "Desna" is my home, I gave it almost 10 years of my life". Ivan Chaus is currently Longest-serving President of the club in Chernihiv.

Personal life
His son Maksym Chaus is a professional football player.

See also
 FC Desna Chernihiv

References

External links
 footballfacts.ru
 Facebook
 Vkontakte

1967 births
Living people
Businesspeople from Chernihiv
FC Desna Chernihiv presidents
Ukrainian football chairmen and investors
Servant of the People (political party) politicians
20th-century Ukrainian businesspeople
21st-century Ukrainian businesspeople